Backstage is a 1988 Australian film starring American singer Laura Branigan. The film was written and directed by Academy Award nominee Jonathan Hardy, who had also written Breaker Morant.

Plot
The plot centred on American pop singer Kate Lawrence (Branigan) wanting to embark on a career as an actress. The only job she can find is playing the lead role in an Australian theatre production of The Green Year Passes. The hiring of an American causes conflict with her Australian cast and crew, and the chagrin of theatre critic Robert Landau with whom she has an affair.

Production
In 1981 Frank Howson set up a company, Boulevard Films, with a view to making movies. He wanted to make a film on Les Darcy, Something Great, and collaborated with Jonathan Hardy on the script. They could not secure financing but Hardy showed Howson some other scripts he had written, including Backstage. Backstage had originally been meant to be directed in 1982 by John Lamond starring Max Phipps, Jill Perryman and Steve Tandy but the film did not eventuate.

Howson and Hardy decided to work on Backstage together, with the story being relocated to the music world. Howson got Laura Branigan interested in the lead. The Burrowes Film Group needed to make another film before the end of the financial year and offered to raise the budget.

Frank Howson originally thought that the involvement of the Burrowes Film Group would be limited but found they wanted to have more creative control. "I knew very clearly what audience it should be made for", said Howson, "but all of a sudden I found myself dealing with production by committee. To even make the smallest decision required everyone sitting around the table."

Matters reached an impasse when Howson and Burrowes fought over who would compose the music. Burrowes fired Howson's composer, John Capek, and replaced him with Bruce Rowlands, then Burrowes bought Boulevard out of the film.

Filming started 7 March 1986.

Release
The film was briefly released theatrically in Australia, before being released on home video internationally. Allmovie calls it an "insipid and cliché-ridden romantic comedy", although Variety conceded the film was "well crafted in every department". David Stratton called the film " neither funny nor romantic, and will do little for the careers of anyone involved in it." The film received bad reviews generally.

Branigan also performed several songs in the film.

The funding of the film was investigated in an episode of ABC's Four Corners.

Cast
Laura Branigan – Kate Lawrence
Michael Aitkens – Robert Landau
Noel Ferrier – Mortimer Wynde
Rowena Wallace – Evelyn Hough
Kym Gyngell – Paarvo
Mary Ward – Geraldine Woollencraft

See also
Cinema of Australia

References

External links
 
Backstage at Oz Movies

1988 films
Australian drama films
1988 drama films
Films shot in Melbourne
1980s English-language films